The men's freestyle light heavyweight competition at the 1964 Summer Olympics in Tokyo took place from 11 to 14 October at the Komazawa Gymnasium. Nations were limited to one competitor.

Competition format

This freestyle wrestling competition continued to use the "bad points" elimination system introduced at the 1928 Summer Olympics for Greco-Roman and at the 1932 Summer Olympics for freestyle wrestling, as adjusted at the 1960 Summer Olympics. Each bout awarded 4 points. If the victory was by fall, the winner received 0 and the loser 4. If the victory was by decision, the winner received 1 and the loser 3. If the bout was tied, each wrestler received 2 points. A wrestler who accumulated 6 or more points was eliminated. Rounds continued until there were 3 or fewer uneliminated wrestlers. If only 1 wrestler remained, he received the gold medal. If 2 wrestlers remained, point totals were ignored and they faced each other for gold and silver (if they had already wrestled each other, that result was used). If 3 wrestlers remained, point totals were ignored and a round-robin was held among those 3 to determine medals (with previous head-to-head results, if any, counting for this round-robin).

Results

Round 1

 Bouts

 Points

Round 2

Five wrestlers were eliminated; 11 remained. Three had 1 point.

 Bouts

 Points

Round 3

Four wrestlers were eliminated, leaving 7 to continue. Takhti took sole possession of the lead, staying at 1 point.

 Bouts

 Points

Round 4

Only two wrestlers were eliminated in this round. Each of the remaining 5 had at least 3 points.

 Bouts

 Points

Round 5

Ayık advanced to the final round with a bye; the two bouts in round 5 would eliminate at least 2 and possibly 3 other wrestlers. Medved defeated Jutzeler to eliminate the latter wrestler. The draw between Takhti and Mustafov resulted in only Takhti's elimination; Mustafov had started with 3 points and the tie placed him at 5, not enough for elimination.

 Bouts

 Points

Final round

Ayık's draws against Mustafov (in round 1) and Medved (in round 3) counted for the final round. The only bout left between the medalists was Medved against Mustafov; the winner would take gold and the loser bronze. Medved pinned Mustafov in 39 seconds.

 Bouts

 Points

References

Wrestling at the 1964 Summer Olympics